Andrey Vasilyevich Balashov   (22 March 1946 – 21 October 2009) was a Russian sailor. He won a silver medal in the Finn class at the 1976 Summer Olympics and bronze medal in the same class at the 1980 Summer Olympics.

References
 Andrey Balashov's profile at Sports Reference.com

1946 births
2009 deaths
Sportspeople from Saint Petersburg
Russian male sailors (sport)
Soviet male sailors (sport)
Olympic sailors of the Soviet Union
Sailors at the 1976 Summer Olympics – Finn
Sailors at the 1980 Summer Olympics – Finn
Olympic silver medalists for the Soviet Union
Olympic bronze medalists for the Soviet Union
Olympic medalists in sailing
Medalists at the 1980 Summer Olympics
Medalists at the 1976 Summer Olympics